Sekolah Menengah Kebangsaan Hillcrest is a public school situated in Taman Sri Gombak and is regarded as one of the schools in the state of Selangor in Malaysia. The school is widely known as ""Hillcrest"" among students of the school itself and the community.

History

The school construction was started in 1989 and the first block was completed in 1991, hence opening on 1 December 1990. The school area was originally an estate of 8.2 hectares. The school was named Hillcrest, by the Gombak Prefecture Education Office, after the developing company that have developed the neighborhood that the school is intended to serve, the Taman Seri Gombak neighborhood.

Encik Irwan Tan Abdullah, who was the then-senior assistant, was elected as the first acting-principal on 1 December 1992. The first principal is Puan Sukma Murni Bt Abdul Samad. During that time, only the Munsyi building is in operation and the other building, the Sri Lanang building was still under construction. Kajai building was officially completed in 1996. With the operation of the new building, the school now have a Kemahiran Hidup Lab (Life Skills Labs), three science labs and another two new classrooms in operation.

On 1 July 1997, Puan Rohani Bt Bakar became the principal succeeding the first principal, Puan Sukma Murni. She served the school for six months before she is transferred to SMK Melawati. She was then succeeded by Puan Hodaima Bt Haji Halil. She served seven years before her retirement in 2005. Pn Kamalyah Bt Teh Mohamed followed. Pn Nik Maryam bt Idris whom joined the school in 2007 succeeded Pn Kamalyah. Later in 2011, Pn Sharifah Bt Mamat succeeded Pn Nik Maryam. She is currently the incumbent principal. Starting from the year of 2009, the school is accepting Form 6 students for both Science and Arts Stream. Both the Zaaba and Sri Lanang blocks are occupied by Form 6 students. There are currently 130 Arts stream students and 160 Science stream students for Form 6.

Parent-Teacher Association

The first PIBG meeting was launched by then-Yang Berhormat Datin Paduka Zaleha Bt Ismail on 17 January 1993.

Administration
The incumbent key-people 

 Tuan Abdul Samat Bin Ismail, Principal

 Nor Mariha Binti Bahauddin, Senior Assistant.

 En. N. Nagarajah Nagappan, Student Affairs

 Pn. Nor Azizah Binti Abd Aziz, Co-Curricular.

 Pn. Chee Mei Ling, Afternoon Session.

Former Principals
The school has been headed by female principal since its establishment.

Co-Curricular

Annual Sports Day

The school's first sports day was held on 12 February 1993 and was launched by Yang Berhormat Encik Ahmad Bahari Abdul Rahman, the then-parliamentary member of Gombak SETIA. The school's first sport flag was also launched by him. There are four sports house which are:
 Munsyi House -Yellow
 Kajai House -Green
 Sri Lanang House -Red
 Keris Mas House - Purple
 Zaa'ba House - Blue

Sports
 Badminton
 Basketball
 Chess
 Football
 Table Tennis
 Softball
 Hockey
 Handball
 Volleyball
 Archery
 Track & Field

Uniformed Bodies
 Malaysian Red Crescent Society
 Police Cadets
 Malaysian Scouting Association
 Girl Guides Malaysia
 Silat Gayung
 Firefighter Cadet

Societies
 Chinese Society of SMK Hillcrest
 Crime Prevention Society
 English Language Society
 Economic Society
 History Society
 Islamic Studies Society
 Mathematics Society
 Malay Language Society
 Moral Studies Society
 Multimedia Club
 Science Society

Hillcrest Middle School.

See also 
 List of schools in Selangor

References
 Majalah Bestari Sekolah Menengah Kebangsaan Hillcrest (2011), Edisi 15, Versi 2011
 Majalah Bestari Sekolah Menengah Kebangsaan Hillcrest (2008), Edisi 11, Versi 2008
 Majalah Bestari Sekolah Menengah Kebangsaan Hillcrest (2007), Edisi 10, Versi 2007
  Ministry of Education Malaysia official websites
  UNESCO, Ministry of Education Malaysia

External links
  Unofficial students website

Gombak District
Publicly funded schools in Malaysia
Secondary schools in Malaysia
1992 establishments in Malaysia
Educational institutions established in 1992
Schools in Selangor